The Village (Tskhra Mtas Ikit) is a 2015 Georgian drama film, directed by Levan Tutberidze and starring Crystal Bennett and Tornike Bziava. The film premiered on 15 May 2015 at Seattle International Film Festival.

Cast 
Crystal Bennett 
Tornike Bziava
Mikheil Gomiashvili
Nugzar Kurashvili
Eka Molodinashvili
Tornike Gogrichiani

References

External links
 

2015 films
2010s Georgian-language films
2015 drama films
Drama films from Georgia (country)